Hubert Gostomski (born 25 February 1998) is a Polish professional footballer who plays as a goalkeeper for Wissa Szczuczyn.

References

External links
 
 

1998 births
Living people
Association football goalkeepers
Polish footballers
Poland youth international footballers
Ekstraklasa players
Jagiellonia Białystok players
Radomiak Radom players
Bruk-Bet Termalica Nieciecza players
GKS Jastrzębie players
I liga players
II liga players
III liga players